Rafael Coutinho Barcellos dos Santos (7 March 1984 – 4 October 2020), known as just Coutinho, was a Brazilian footballer who played for Agremiação Sportiva Arapiraquense (ASA) as a defensive midfielder.

Career
Coutinho made his professional debut aged 19 for Vasco da Gama in the 2–1 win over Coritiba on 25 September 2003. He scored his first goal in the Rio Derby against Flamengo on 11 April 2004.

Coutinho was signed by Fortaleza in a one-year deal in January 2009.

Honours
Tombense
 Campeonato Brasileiro Série D: 2014

References

External links
 CBF
 netvasco.com.br
 rafaelcoutinho.com.br
 crvascodagama.com
 Guardian Stats Centre

1984 births
2020 deaths
Brazilian footballers
Brazilian expatriate footballers
CR Vasco da Gama players
C.F. Estrela da Amadora players
Botafogo de Futebol e Regatas players
Tombense Futebol Clube players
Figueirense FC players
Criciúma Esporte Clube players
Fortaleza Esporte Clube players
Guarani FC players
América Futebol Clube (RN) players
Clube Atlético Linense players
Associação Portuguesa de Desportos players
Campeonato Brasileiro Série A players
Campeonato Brasileiro Série B players
Primeira Liga players
Expatriate footballers in Portugal
Association football midfielders
People from Macaé
Sportspeople from Rio de Janeiro (state)